Hauppauge Union Free School District is a public school district, serving Hauppauge, New York. It is near the Commack School District and Half Hollow Hills Central School District.

The superintendent of schools is Dr. Dennis P. O'Hara.

Schools
Hauppauge UFSD contains the following schools:

Elementary schools 
 Bretton Woods Elementary School
 Forest Brook Elementary School
 Pines Elementary School

Secondary schools 
 Hauppage Middle School
 Hauppauge High School

References

External links

 Hauppauge Union Free School District

School districts in New York (state)
Education in Suffolk County, New York